Baghlujeh-ye Sardar (also Romanized as Bāghlūjeh-ye Sardār and Bāghlūjeh Sardār; also known as Bāghlūjah and Bagludzhakh) is a village in Zanjanrud-e Pain Rural District, Zanjanrud District, Zanjan County, Zanjan Province, Iran. At the 2006 census, its population was 293, in 73 families.

References 

Populated places in Zanjan County